Dynasty is a live album by saxophonist Stan Getz recorded in London and originally released on the Verve label in 1971 as a double album.

Reception

The AllMusic review by Michael G. Nastos stated "Dynasty represents an interesting period in the artistic life of Getz, well out of pure bop, in between his commercial successes with Brazilian music, and on the verge of another phase of his life with fusion pioneers like Chick Corea. This is highly recommended, a solid effort from top to bottom".

Track listing
All compositions by Eddy Louiss except where noted.
 "Dum! Dum!" - 13:18
 "Ballad for Leo" (René Thomas) - 9:15
 "Our Kind of Sabi" - 17:08
 "Mona" (Albert Mangelsdorff) - 8:30
 "Theme for Emmanuel" (Thomas) - 11:25
 "Invitation" (Bronisław Kaper, Paul Francis Webster) - 4:37
 "Ballad for My Dad" (Louiss, Thomas) - 3:12
 "Song for Martine" - 10:52
 "Dynasty" - 9:42
 "I Remember Clifford" (Benny Golson) - 5:24  (bonus track - on 1989 CD reissue only)

Personnel 
Stan Getz - tenor saxophone
Eddy Louiss - organ
René Thomas -  guitar 
Bernard Lubat - drums

References 

1971 live albums
Stan Getz live albums
Verve Records live albums
Albums produced by George Martin
albums recorded at Ronnie Scott's Jazz Club